Shaili Chopra is an Indian business journalist, author and entrepreneur. She is the founder of SheThePeople.TV, a platform to empower women with stories of role models and inspire them with a changing conversation on women and what matters to them. As a business journalist, she is known for working at NDTV-profit and ETNOW and has won the 2012 Ramnath Goenka Award for Excellence in Business Journalism among various other awards. She then switched to being an entrepreneur and wrote four books. Her ventures are India's women's channel SheThePeople.TV and GolfingIndian.com. Her books include Feminist Rani by Penguin, When I Was 25 by Random House, Big Connect- Social Media and Indian Politics by Random House, and Birdies in Business by Times Books.

Early life
Shaili Chopra was born in Jalandhar on 21 July 1981 in Punjab to Anil and Suman. Anil Chopra is a retired fighter pilot from InCollege of Journalism, Chennai. She trained in broadcast with the BBC at journalism school. She has worked at CNBC, NDTV and ETNOW.

Professional life
dian Air Force]]. In 1998, Chopra finished her schooling from Air Force Golden Jubilee Institute, New Delhi. Chopra finished her master's degree in Broadcast and Television from 2002 batch, [[Asian College of Journalism, Chennai|The Asian 
She worked with NDTV 24 x 7 as Markets & Corporate Affairs Editor and NDTV Profit as the Senior News Editor-Corporate for over five years and then with ET NOW for three years. She has also covered international events like the G-20, WEF@Davos, The Bretton Woods Conference 2011, India Economic Summit and the World Retail Congress. She was named one of India's 50 most influential women in media, marketing and advertising by Impact Magazine.

Chopra and her husband Shivnath Thukral also reported live from outside the Taj Mahal Hotel in Mumbai during the terror attacks of 26/11. She was the lead anchor of ETNOW before she became an entrepreneur. She also had a show on golf called "Tee Time With Shaili".

She started a digital website called 'SheThePeople' in 2015, which focuses on women journalism. Anand Mahindra has invested in SheThePeople.TV. It was also an official partner for government initiatives such as "Start-Up India, Stand Up India" and "Make in India".

Awards 
She won the News Television Award for the Best English Reporter across India in 2007 and later in 2008, her business-golf show Business on Course, won the Best Show Award. In March 2010, Chopra won the Best Business Anchor award and was felicitated with FICCI's Woman Achiever Award. Chopra was awarded the Ramnath Goenka Award for Excellence in Business Journalism at the Indian Express RNG Awards 2012.

Bibliography

References

External links

Interviews 

 Women for action: http://www.womenforaction.org/2017/03/interview-with-prolific-journalist-in.html
 Indian CEO: https://indianceo.in/interviews/shaili-chopra-founder-shethepeople-talks-indianceo/
 Personal Life and goals: https://thehauterfly.com/women-on-top/women-in-digital-shaili-chopra-she-the-people/
 Feminist Rani: https://penguin.co.in/news-and-press-releases/womens-day-penguin-excited-announce-acquisition-feminist-rani-meghna-pant-shaili-chopra/

Indian women television journalists
Indian television journalists
Living people
1981 births
Indian television company founders
Indian women television producers
Indian television producers
Indian women company founders
Indian company founders
Indian business and financial journalists
21st-century Indian women writers
21st-century Indian writers
21st-century Indian journalists
Women writers from Punjab, India
Journalists from Punjab, India
Businesswomen from Punjab, India
Businesspeople from Punjab, India
Women television producers
Women business and financial journalists
Indian journalists